Acalles porosus is a species of hidden snout weevil in the family of beetles known as Curculionidae. It is found in North America.

References

Further reading

 
 

Cryptorhynchinae
Articles created by Qbugbot
Beetles described in 1916